Fort Napoleon may refer to:
 Fort Napoleon, Almaraz, in Spain; a central feature during the Battle of Almaraz fought on 18/19 May 1812 during the Peninsula War
 Fort Napoléon des Saintes in Guadeloupe
 Fort Napoleon, Ostend in Belgium
 Fort Napoléon, Toulon in France
 Fort Napoléon, later renamed Fort Blücher, at Wesel in Germany
 Fort Napoléon, les Saintes